Hriday Deepak Gattani (born 20 January 1991) is an Indian playback singer, music director, songwriter and performer from Mumbai, India.

Personal life  
Hriday Gattani was born and brought up in Mumbai. His father Deepak Gattani has officially managed many music concerts and live performances for music director A. R. Rahman.

Hriday Gattani grew up watching great artists perform live and was surrounded by musicians in his formative years because of his father's career in music management.

Career
Hriday was mentored by the legendary Music Maestro A. R. Rahman. Under Rahman's music direction, Hriday made his Bollywood debut as a singer in the 2014 film Lekar Hum Deewana Dil, with the songs 'Maaloom' and 'Tu Shining'. He got the opportunity for playback singing while he was a student of Western Classical at KM College of Music and Technology.

Apart from touring with A. R. Rahman for live concerts and performances, Hriday has also recorded for A. R. Rahman's 'One Vision', a song composed from prose written by then President, Dr A. P. J. Abdul Kalam. Hriday recorded an upbeat indie pop track "I Just Met Somebody" in collaboration with Singer Neeti Mohan. Neeti sang the Hindi verses of the song while Gattani sang the English ones. He Collaborated with Shruti Pathak on the Fusion cover ‘Nothing on You' and with Suchismita Das on ‘Let It Be'. As per the Singer, his Single 'Uljha' in collaboration with Vishal Dadlani's label VLT (Vishal Likes This), is based on his personal experiences.

Hriday debuted as a full fledged Music Director with a Marathi movie "Youngraad".

Musical style and influence 
After starting out with Classical Music, Gattani branched out to other genres and musical styles. He shifted base to Chennai to learn Western vocals. He also got training under Sanjay Mishra of the Banaras gharana and Vishwaraj Pandit Ji of Mewati Gharana. He simultaneously started composing songs. The Singer revealed in an Interview that A R Rahman has been an influence on him along with John Mayer, Coldplay and The Beatles.

Discography 
 "Tu Shining" — Lekar Hum Deewana Dil (2014)
 "Maaloom" — Lekar Hum Deewana Dil (2014)
 "Khalifa" — Lekar Hum Deewana Dil (2014)
 "I Just Met Somebody" — (2014)
 "Tango Kalalo" — Kaatru Veliyidai (soundtrack) (2017)
 "Piya Basanti" — (2015)
 "Prema Swaramulalo" — 24 (soundtrack) (2016, Dubbed version)
 "My Twin Brother" — 24 (soundtrack) (2016, Dubbed version)
 "Udan Choo" — Banjo (2016)
 "Uljha" — (2016)
 "Sakhi Saheli" — (2017)
 "Over You" — (2017)
 "Sun Re Sajna" — (2017)
 "Maskhari" - Dil Bechara (2020)
 "Main Tumhara" - Dil Bechara (2020)

References

External links 

 

Living people
Indian male singers
Singers from Mumbai
Bollywood playback singers
1991 births